Hans Bellmer (13 March 1902 – 24 February 1975) was a German artist, best known for the life-sized pubescent female dolls he produced in the mid-1930s. Historians of art and photography also consider him a Surrealist photographer.

Biography
Bellmer was born in the city of Kattowitz, then part of the German Empire (now Katowice, Poland). Up until 1926, he worked as a draftsman for his own advertising company.

Bellmer is most famous for the creation of a series of dolls as well as photographs of them. He was influenced in his choice of art form in part by reading the published letters of Oskar Kokoschka (Der Fetisch, 1925). Bellmer's doll project is also said to have been catalysed by a series of events in his personal life. Hans Bellmer takes credit for provoking a physical crisis in his father and brings his own artistic creativity into association with childhood insubordination and resentment toward a severe and humorless paternal authority. Perhaps this is one reason for the nearly universal, unquestioning acceptance in the literature of Bellmer's promotion of his art as a struggle against his father, the police, and ultimately, fascism and the state. Events of his personal life also including meeting a beautiful teenage cousin in 1932 (and perhaps other unattainable beauties), attending a performance of Jacques Offenbach's Tales of Hoffmann (in which a man falls tragically in love with an automaton), and receiving a box of his old toys. After these events, he began to actually construct his first dolls. In his works, Bellmer explicitly sexualized the doll as a young girl. The dolls incorporated the principle of "ball joint", which was inspired by a pair of sixteenth-century articulated wooden dolls in the Kaiser Friedrich Museum Jonathan Hirschfeld has claimed (without further argumentation) that Bellmer initiated his doll project to oppose the fascism of the Nazi Party by declaring that he would make no work that would support the new German state. Represented by mutated forms and unconventional poses, his dolls (according to this view) were directed specifically at the cult of the perfect body then prominent in Germany.

He visited Paris in 1935 and made contacts there, such as Paul Éluard, but returned to Berlin because his wife Margarete was dying of tuberculosis.

Bellmer produced the first doll in Berlin in 1933. Long since lost, the assemblage can nevertheless be correctly described thanks to approximately two dozen photographs Bellmer took at the time of its construction. Standing about fifty-six inches tall, the doll consisted of a modeled torso made of flax fiber, glue, and plaster; a mask-like head of the same material with glass eyes and a long, unkempt wig; and a pair of legs made from broomsticks or dowel rods. One of these legs terminated in a wooden, club-like foot; the other was encased in a more naturalistic plaster shell, jointed at the knee and ankle. As the project progressed, Bellmer made a second set of hollow plaster legs, with wooden ball joints for the doll's hips and knees. There were no arms to the first sculpture, but Bellmer did fashion or find a single wooden hand, which appears among the assortment of doll parts the artist documented in an untitled photograph of 1934, as well as in several photographs of later work.

Bellmer's 1934 anonymous book, The Doll (Die Puppe), produced and published privately in Germany, contains 10 black-and-white photographs of Bellmer's first doll arranged in a series of "tableaux vivants" (living pictures). The book was not credited to him, as he worked in isolation, and his photographs remained almost unknown in Germany. Yet Bellmer's work was eventually declared "degenerate" by the Nazi Party, and he was forced to flee Germany to France in 1938, where Bellmer's work was welcomed by the Surrealists around André Breton.

He aided the French Resistance during the war by making fake passports. He was imprisoned in the Camp des Milles prison at Aix-en-Provence, a brickworks camp for German nationals, from September 1939 until the end of the Phoney War in May 1940.

After the war, Bellmer lived the rest of his life in Paris. Bellmer gave up doll-making and spent the following decades creating erotic drawings, etchings, sexually explicit photographs, paintings, and prints of pubescent girls. In 1954, he met Unica Zürn, who became his companion until her suicide in 1970. He continued working into the 1960s. Of his own work, Bellmer said, "What is at stake here is a totally new unity of form, meaning and feeling: language-images that cannot simply be thought up or written up … They constitute new, multifaceted objects, resembling polyplanes made of mirrors … As if the illogical was relaxation, as if laughter was permitted while thinking, as if error was a way and chance, a proof of eternity.”

Bellmer died 24 February 1975 of bladder cancer. He was buried beside Zürn at Père Lachaise Cemetery with a tomb marked "Bellmer – Zürn".

In popular culture
The New York-based post-punk band Bellmer Dolls took their name from the dolls of Hans Bellmer.

The 2003 film Love Object contains clear references to Bellmer's work, including the protagonist's obsessive relationship with a sex doll and the use of Bellmer's name as a leading character, Lisa Bellmer.

Ghost in the Shell 2: Innocence, a 2004 anime film, features elements of Bellmer's erotic and uncanny dolls.  Additionally, director Mamoru Oshii has referred to Bellmer's dolls as an inspiration for the film.

A creature from the 2001 video game Silent Hill 2 named Mannequin bears a strong resemblance to Bellmer's dolls. However, Masahiro Ito, the monster designer of the game, commented on this saying that they had no influence on his design of the Mannequin; instead his inspiration came from traditional Japanese folklore.

The New York-based avant-garde band Naked City used images of Bellmer's dolls for the front cover and liner notes of their final album, Absinthe.

Exhibitions
 1963: Galerie Daniel Cordier, Paris; "Hans Bellmer”
 1966: Robert Fraser Gallery, London; Bellmer's de Sade Engravings (closed by police)
 1967: Kestner-Gesellschaft, Hannover; Kunst-Verein, Berlin; Galerie Wolfgang Ketterer, Munich; "Hans Bellmer”
 1970: Stedelijk Museum, Amsterdam; "Hans Bellmer”
 1971: CNAC Archives, Paris; "Hans Bellmer (retrospective)”
 1975: Museum of Contemporary Art, Chicago; "Hans Bellmer, Drawings and Sculpture.
 1976: Galerie André Francois Petit, Paris; Galerie Brusberg, Hannover; "Hommage à Hans Bellmer”
 1983: Centre Georges Pompidou and Filipacchi, Paris; "Hans Bellmer, Photographe”
 1984: Kestnergesellschaft, Hannover; "Hans Bellmer, Photographien”
 1985: Editions Graphiques, London; "Hans Bellmer”
 1990: Isidore Ducasse Fine Arts, New York; "Hans Bellmer”
 1991: Krannert Art Museum, Champaign, IL; Hans Bellmer: Photographs
 1992: Musée Saint-Roch, Issoudun; "Hans Bellmer par son Graveur Cécile Reims”
 1997: Musée-Galerie de la Seita, Paris; "Bellmer Graveur, 1902–1975”
 1999: Ubu Gallery, New York; Galerie Berinson, Berlin; "Photographs and Drawings for the 30s”
 2001: International Center of Photography, New York; Behind Closed Doors: The Art of Hans Bellmer
 2006: Centre Georges Pompidou, Paris; "Hand Bellmer: Anatomie du Désir”; Whitechapel Gallery, London 'Hans Bellmer'
 2010: Neue Nationalgalerie Berlin; Double Sexus: Bellmer – Bourgeois

Bibliography
 Die Puppe, 1934.
 La Poupée, 1936. (Translated to French by Robert Valançay)
 Trois Tableaux, Sept Dessins, Un Texte, 1944.
 Les Jeux de la  Poupée, 1944. (Text by Bellmer with Poems by Paul Eluard)
 "Post-scriptum," from Hexentexte by Unica Zürn, 1954.
 L'Anatomie de l'Image, 1957.
  "La Pére" in Le Surréalisme Même, No. 4, Spring 1958. (Translated to French by Robert Valançay in 1936)
 "Strip-tease" in Le Surréalisme Même, No. 4, Spring 1958.
 Friedrich Schröder-Sonnenstern, 1959.
 Die Puppe: Die Puppe, Die Spiele der Puppe, und Die Anatomie des Bildes, 1962. (Text by Bellmer with Poems by Eluard)
 Oracles et Spectacles, 1965.
 Mode d'Emploi, 1967.
 "88, Impasse de l'Espérance," 1975. (Originally written in 1960 for an uncompleted book by Gisèle Prassinos entitled L'Homme qui a Perdu son Squelette)
 The Doll, translated and with an introduction by Malcolm Green in a facsimile of the 1962 German edition, London, Atlas Press, 2005,

Notes

References
 Fabrice Flahutez, « Hans Bellmer et Georges Bataille, une collaboration éditoriale », cat. exhib. (French) Sous le signe de Bataille. Masson, Fautrier, Bellmer, Christian Dérouet (currator), Musée ZERVOS à Vézelay, 2012.
 Fabrice Flahutez, « Bellmer illustrateur de Bataille. Des pièces inédites au dossier des gravures d’Histoire de l’œil (1945–1947) », in Les Nouvelles de l’estampe, n°227–228, mars 2010, p. 27–32.(French)
 Hans Bellmer: Anatomie du Désir (2006, [Éditions Gallimard / Centre Pompidou]).(French)
 The Doll, Hans Bellmer, Atlas Press, London, 2006, trans. Malcolm Green (first complete translation of Bellmer's suite of essays, poems and photos from the final German version)
 Sue Taylor. Hans Bellmer: The Anatomy of Anxiety (2002, MIT Press).
 Therese Lichtenstein, Behind Closed Doors: The Art of Hans Bellmer, University of California Press, 2001.
 Fabrice Flahutez, « Hans Bellmer : l’anagramme poétique au service d’un rêve surréaliste », Histoire de l’art, n° 52, Paris, 2001, p. 79–94.(French)
 Céline Masson, La fabrique de la poupée chez Hans Bellmer, Paris, éd. L'Harmattan, 2000.(French)
 Pierre Dourthe, Hans Bellmer : Le Principe de Perversion, Paris, Jean-Pierre Faur Éditeur, 1999.(French)
 Fabrice Flahutez, Catalogue raisonné des estampes de Hans Bellmer, Paris, Nouvelles Éditions Doubleff, 1999.(French)
 Robert C. Morgan. "Hans Bellmer:The Infestation of Eros", in A Hans Bellmer Miscellany, Anders Malmburg, Malmo and Timothy Baum, New York, 1993

Further reading
 Marvin Altner: Hans Bellmer, die Spiele der Puppe. Zu den Puppendarstellungen in der bildenden Kunst von 1914–1938. VDG-Verlag, Weimar 2005,  (zugl. FU Dissertation, Berlin 2002)
 Renate Berger: Pars pro toto, Zum Verhältnis von künstlerischer Freiheit und sexueller Integrität. In: Renate Berger, Daniela Hammer-Tugendhat (Hrsg.): Der Garten der Lüste, Zur Deutung des Erotischen und Sexuellen bei Künstlern und ihren Interpreten. DuMont, Köln 1985, S. 150–199, 
 Pierre Dourthe: Hans Bellmer. Le principe de perversion. Faur, Paris 1999, 
 Alex Grall (Hrsg.): Die Zeichnungen von Hans Bellmer. Propyläen-Verlag, Berlin 1969
 Malcolm Green: Introduction, in The Doll, Hans Bellmer, trans. Malcolm Green. Atlas Press, London 2006, 
 Therese Lichtenstein: Behind Closed Doors. The Art of Hans Bellmer. University of California Press, New York 2001, 
 Gottfried Sello: Den Puppen verfallen. In: Die Zeit, Nr. 19/1967
 Michael Semff/Anthony Spira (Hrsg.): Hans Bellmer. Hatje Cantz Verlag, Ostfildern 2006, 
 Sue Taylor: Hans Bellmer. The Anatomy of Anxiety. MIT Press, Cambridge, Mass. 2002, 
 Peter Webb, Robert Short: Hans Bellmer. Quartet Books, New York 1985
 Peter Webb, Robert Short: Death, Desire and the Doll: The Life and Art of Hans Bellmer. Solar Books, 2006.

External links
 SF MOMA page, showing the complete series of the first book, Die Puppe (in its French version, La Poupée, 1936).
 Tate Collection Page
 MoMA Collection Page
 

1902 births
1975 deaths
People from the Province of Silesia
20th-century German painters
German male painters
German sculptors
German male sculptors
20th-century French painters
French male painters
Modern painters
Modern sculptors
People from Katowice
German surrealist artists
French surrealist artists
Burials at Père Lachaise Cemetery
20th-century French sculptors
20th-century French male artists
French male sculptors
Deaths from bladder cancer
Deaths from cancer in France